Laurin Boehler (born 4 January 1995) is an Austrian judoka.

He is the bronze medallist of the 2019 Judo Grand Slam Düsseldorf in the -100 kg category.

He is in a relationship with Lubjana Piovesana.

References

External links
 
 
 

1995 births
Living people
Austrian male judoka